(19 July 1924 – 29 April 2006) was a Japanese film actor. He appeared in 27 films between 1949 and 2001.

Selected filmography
 Man in the Storm (1950)
 Yellow Crow (1957)
 Jigoku (1960)
 The Ghost Cat of Otama Pond (1960)
 Ring (1998)
 The Princess Blade (2001)

External links

1924 births
2006 deaths
Japanese male film actors